JD Institute of Fashion Technology is the educational division of JD Educational Trust. The institute was founded on 12 October 1988 in Mumbai, India. Since then it has expanded to 40+ learning centers located Pan India. It provides multi-disciplinary education in the field of Fashion Design, Interior Design, Jewellery Design, Fashion Communication, Fashion Styling, Fashion and Lifestyle Entrepreneurship, Fashion Business Management, Visual Merchandising, Fashion Photography, and Hair and Make-up Artistry along with new-age design courses in Visual Arts, Textile Designing, Event Management and UI/UX.

JD is affiliated to Bengaluru City University, Goa University and associated with Singhania University for its Masters and undergraduate programme. JD Institute of Fashion Technology was ranked 12 and 14 for Fashion Design by India Today2020 and The Week 2020, respectively.

Bengaluru City University: The Bangalore campus of JD Institute of Fashion Technology is affiliated to Bengaluru City University for all its Undergrad degrees.(Pg. 13, No. 152)

Goa University: The Goa campus of JD Institute of Fashion Technology is affiliated to Goa University for its Undergrad degrees.

Singhania University: JD Institute of Fashion Technology is associated with Singhania University for its new-age Masters and undergraduate programme.

Academics
The institute offers the below mentioned programs

Masters:
 MSc. in Fashion Design and Management – 2 years
 MSc. in Interior Design – 2 years
 MSc. in Fashion and Textile Design – 2 years
 MBA in Fashion Business and Event Management – 2 years
 MA in Fashion Communication – 2 years
 MA in User Experience and Interaction Design (UI/UX) – 2 years

Degree:
 BSc. in Fashion and Apparel Design – 3 years
 BSc. in Fashion Design and Garment Management – 3 years
 BSc. in Interior Design and Decoration – 3 years
 BSc. in Interior Design – 3 years
 BSc. in Jewellery Design – 3 years
 BBA in Event Management – 3 years
 BVA in Graphic Design – 4 years
 BVA in Product Design – 4 years

Diploma:
 Advanced Diploma in Fashion Design – 3 years
 Advanced Diploma in Interior Design – 3 years
 PG Diploma in Fashion Design and Business Management – 2 years
 PG Diploma in Fashion Communication – 2 years
 PG Diploma in Interior and Spatial Design – 2 years
 Diploma in Fashion Design – 1 year
 Diploma in Interior Design – 1 year
 Diploma in Fashion Business Management – 1 year
 Diploma in Fine Jewellery Design – 1 year
 Diploma in Jewellery Design (CAD) – 6 months
 Diploma in Visual Merchandising – 6 months
 Diploma in Makeup and Hairstyle Artistry – 4 months (Weekend)
 Diploma in Fashion Styling – 3 months
 Diploma in Fashion Photography – 3 months
 Diploma in International Fashion Styling – 40 days
 Diploma in Makeup and Hairstyle Artistry – 6 weeks

Learning centers
JD Institute of Fashion Technology has 40+ learning centres located in major cities in India. The infrastructure at these learning centers includes state of the art facility, well-equipped offline and e-library, CAD lab, textile lab, sewing lab, draping lab, interior workstation and jewellery lab to facilitate learning.

Collaborations and Partnerships
The Institute is also a member of various prestigious bodies like:
 Cumulus
 Indo-Italian Chamber of Commerce and Industry
 Indo French Chamber of Commerce and Industry
 The Council of EU Chambers of Business in India
 EQAC (Education quality accreditation Commission, Spain)
 Adobe India
 IIID (Institute of Indian Interior Designers)
 ADI (Association of Designers of India)
 KOEFIA, Rome, Italy
 London College of Fashion
 Chelsea College of Arts
 Georgian College, Canada

JD Annual Design Awards
The JD Annual Design Awards revolve around a different theme every year. This event was initiated to provide a platform for graduating students to showcase their designs and present their final work in front of key industry experts, peers and media.

Imagination Journey
JD Institute of Fashion Technology’s Imagination Journey is a 40 days styling course that takes place at London College of Fashion and a Retail Display & Design course at Chelsea College of Arts for the students of Interior Design. The study tour also includes a trip to Paris. The tour to Paris and London provides a visual expedition to the tourist spots and also acts as an observation exercise.

The 3Cs – Conversations, Community and Conference
3Cs’ is a medium to bring together practitioners, researchers and experts who have worked on or thought about design from a variety of perspectives, disciplines, and fields under one common platform to raise awareness, educate and open a dialogue with students.

The initiative was started by the institute to enable students to gain a wider outlook at how design can be derived from varied fields and how it impacts their streams. This also helps students to gain a better understanding of the environment, society and culture and its overall impact on the field of design education.

Awards and Recognitions
 Best Fashion and Interior Design Institute of the Year 2021 under Quality Education and Leading Infrastructure by National Architecture and Interior Design Excellence Awards and Conference 2021
 Mr. Nealesh Dalal, Managing Trustee – JD Educational Trust was honored with the Outstanding Contribution in Educational Domain Award at the National Architecture and Interior Design Excellence Awards and Conference 2021
 Best Interior Design Institute 2020 at the National Architecture and Interior Design Excellence Awards and Conference 2020.
 Global Excellence in Design Education Award - Times Education Excellence 2019 organized by The Times Group.
 The Global League Institute by Great Place to Study, London.
 The 10 Most Recommended Higher Education Institutes 2019 – July 2019
 The 20 Best Higher Education Institutes of India 2019 – by Education Braniac.
 International Quality Awards 2019.
 Leaders in Education at UK Asian Business Awards 2018.
 Best Skill Learning for Fashion Design in India at the Indian Education Awards 2018
 Best Fashion Design Institution 2017 by Higher Education
 Best Fashion and Interior Design Institute in India Award 2017 at India Education Award is an award organized by Blindwink.
 Best Vocational Education Institute of the Year - Fashion Design at 7th Indian Education Awards by Indian Education Congress, 2017.
 Celebrating spirit of Self-reliance with Team Sui Dhaga

See also
 International Women Polytechnic

References

External links

Educational institutions established in 1988
Fashion schools in India
Education in Delhi
Schools in Mumbai
1988 establishments in Maharashtra